Secret (Greta Hayes) is a fictional character, a superhero in the DC Comics universe.

Fictional character biography
Secret first appeared in a one-shot comic, part of the Girlfrenzy fifth week event, by Todd Dezago and Todd Nauck called Young Justice: The Secret, in which Robin, Impulse, and Superboy helped her to escape from the DEO (Department of Extranormal Operations) agents who were holding her against her will. Secret was incorporeal, able to take on a variety of appearances, and is referred to as "the mist girl" or "the bottle girl" by the various agents who pursue her throughout the run of Young Justice.

Eventually, her origin was revealed: Secret was once an ordinary girl named Greta, whose adoptive brother Billy killed her as part of his plan to become the supervillain Harm. Because of the manner of her death, Greta remained stuck on this plane of existence, a gateway between the living and the dead. Billy himself, after attacking the team, died when his own father shot him. Billy returned during the Day of Judgment storyline, as the entirety of Hell had been evacuated. He again battled the team, using the substance of Secret.

Secret joined Young Justice along with Wonder Girl and Arrowette. She was often referred to as "Suzie" because her real name was unknown at the time. Secret became good friends with the two girls, and was often portrayed as shy. She nursed a crush on Robin throughout the series, and often defended his actions and followed his leadership without doubt. She also expressed jealousy of Spoiler, Robin's girlfriend, to the point where the pair of them had a full-out battle across Gotham City, that was stopped by the combined efforts of Red Tornado and Robin.

In an alternate reality, Secret's powers had been taken on by Billy. Ironically, Billy fought for what he perceived as justice in this form.

During the Sins of Youth storyline, a temporarily adult Secret, with the aid of Deadman, chased down Teekl, the feline familiar of the villain Klarion the Witch Boy. Surprising her age-altered friends, she caused Klarion to back down by threatening to kill Teekl. When undoing everything he had done, Klarion insisted that it was everyone or nothing. Secret didn't want to change back, but was persuaded by Robin, who promised to always be there for her. As predicted by the nearby hero Merry Pemberton, this would later cause many problems. Secret would even go so far as to physically threaten Spoiler.

During the time when Hal Jordan tried to mentor Secret, she visited her father in jail. Under the mental influence of Billy, her father rejected her, leaving her more despondent than before.

Secret eventually gave in to the darkness in her nature at the behest of Darkseid, whom she mistakenly called 'Doug Side'. During her time on Darkseid's planet of Apokolips, Billy, possessing her father, launched the body into one of the firepits, killing them both. Although Secret's mentor, Hal Jordan had offered to step in and save Greta, as well as the world, the current team advisor Snapper Carr rejected the offer, preferring that the kids use Secret's turning evil as a 'learning experience'. Tim was able to talk her down. In the last issue of Young Justice, a disgusted Darkseid stripped her of her powers, leaving her an ordinary, living girl, and thus resurrected from her death, which was ironically just as she always wanted to be.

Finally having a life of her own, she attends the Elias School for Girls, along with Cassandra Sandsmark and Cissie King-Jones.

In the pages of "The New Golden Age", Secret's history was changed where she was the sidekick of the Spectre and later disappeared. She was revealed to be a prisoner of a Time Scavenger called Childminder on Orphan Island where she is kept in a special cell where her ghostly abilities won't work.

Powers and abilities
As a ghost, Secret can fly, teleport, shapeshift, become ethereal, possess any sentient beings, and take souls to the "other side".

In other media
 An alternate universe incarnation of Secret makes a cameo appearance in Teen Titans Go! #48.
 Secret appears in the Young Justice episode "Secrets", voiced by Masasa Moyo. Similarly to the comics, this version was killed by her brother Billy, who severed his emotional connections to wield the Sword of Beowulf. Due to her dying while witnessing a nearby building's neon sign that said "secret", her restless spirit can only say that word. Amidst Billy's fights with Artemis Crock and Zatanna, Greta helps the pair defeat him by rendering him incapable of wielding the sword. After the heroes defeat him, Greta vanishes while Zatanna promises to give her a proper burial.

References

External links
 Secret at DC Comics Wiki

DC Comics characters who are shapeshifters
DC Comics characters who can teleport
DC Comics female superheroes
DC Comics undead characters
Fictional characters with spirit possession or body swapping abilities
Fictional ghosts
Fictional soul collectors